Michael William Liddle (born 25 December 1989) is a professional footballer who plays as a defender for  club Blyth Spartans. He began his club career with Sunderland, though appeared only once for the first team, and spent time on loan at Carlisle United, Leyton Orient, Gateshead and Accrington Stanley, before joining the latter club on a permanent basis in 2012. He then moved into non-league football with Dunston UTS, Blyth Spartans and Darlington, before returning to Blyth Spartans in 2021.

He has played for Ireland at under-18, under-19 and under-21 level.

Club career

Sunderland
Liddle started his footballing career with Haydon Bridge and Sunderland, whom he joined as a youth player. At Sunderland he progressed through the youth side and was given a professional contract ahead of the 2008–09 season. It took until January 2010 for him to make his first-team debut, in a FA Cup third-round match at home to Barrow; he came on as a substitute late in the game which Sunderland won 3–0.

Loan spells
On 14 November 2008, Liddle joined League One club Carlisle United on two months' loan; he joined up with fellow Sunderland loanee Graham Kavanagh. His debut came the following day, in the starting eleven for Carlisle's 3–1 win against Brighton & Hove Albion. The loan was first extended until 14 February 2009, and then to the end of the season; he went on to make 22 appearances.

Liddle signed a four-month youth loan with another League One club, Leyton Orient, on 5 August 2010, but returned to Sunderland after only a month because of a groin injury. His only appearance was in the starting eleven against Yeovil Town.

On 6 January 2011, Liddle joined Gateshead on a 28-day loan. He made his debut two days later in a 2–2 draw with Kidderminster Harriers, and "curl[ed] a beauty into the far corner with the outside of his boot" for his first senior goal, which was voted Gateshead's goal of the season. His loan was extended to the end of the 2010–11 season, which he finished with 22 Conference Premier appearances.

Accrington Stanley
Liddle joined League Two club Accrington Stanley on loan for an initial month on 24 February 2012, and made his debut the next day in a 2–0 loss against Swindon Town. He was sent off against Southend United on 10 March, and after he served his suspension, his loan was extended to the end of the season. He made 12 appearances, all in league competition.

He signed a one-year permanent deal with Stanley in July 2012; the fee was undisclosed. He began the season as a regular in the starting eleven until 18 September, when the second sending-off of his Stanley career, just before Chesterfield scored a winning goal, resulted in a three-match ban. He finished the season with 36 appearances in all competitions.

Liddle signed a new one-year contract with the club ahead of the 2013–14 season. He appeared in the first five matches of the season before an ankle injury was to keep him out for two months; he returned to the first team as a late substitute against Wycombe Wanderers. He lost his place to short-term signing Lee Naylor, and the rest of Liddle's season was disrupted by hamstring trouble and competition from Laurence Wilson.

After signing on for a third year, Liddle started the opening game of the season, but a "succession of niggling injuries" were to keep him out for three months. He made his first-team return in the FA Cup first round, a goalless draw with Notts County in which manager John Coleman thought he was the best player. He finished the season with 15 league appearances, more than half as a substitute, and was released when his contract expired.

Later career
Liddle went on trial at Scottish Championship club Hibernian. However, he suffered a knee injury during a development match and the club offered him support during his recovery period.

After a spell with Northern League club Dunston UTS towards the end of the 2015–16 season, Liddle joined Blyth Spartans of the Northern Premier League in June 2016. He made his debut in the opening game of the season, in a 3-1 win over Coalville Town. He spent three seasons with Spartans and then signed for National League North club Darlington in May 2019. Despite interruptions through injury, Liddle made 29 appearances in the curtailed 2019–20 season. He was a regular in 2020–21 before the National League North was abandoned because of COVID-19 pandemic-related issues, and left the club at the end of that season.

Liddle rejoined Blyth Spartans in May 2021.

International career
Liddle was born in England and qualifies to play for Ireland because his mother is Irish. After playing in the under-18s and under-19s for his country, Liddle was called up to the Ireland under-21 squad for a friendly against Austria U21 on 19 August 2008. At that stage he had not made an appearance for his club after being signed on a professional contract in the 2008–09 season. Sunderland manager, Roy Keane, commented that "The young players have done well. It's a real plus for us and I have no doubts that some of them will be able to handle it at the top level". He started against Austria, in a 1–1 draw. Liddle said "The call-up came as a big surprise. I didn't expect it. When I was named in the starting eleven  buzzing!" He made further appearances against Bulgaria, Portugal, Lithuania and Germany.

Career statistics

References

External links

1989 births
Living people
Footballers from Hounslow
English footballers
Republic of Ireland association footballers
Republic of Ireland under-21 international footballers
Association football defenders
Sunderland A.F.C. players
Carlisle United F.C. players
Leyton Orient F.C. players
Gateshead F.C. players
Accrington Stanley F.C. players
Dunston UTS F.C. players
Blyth Spartans A.F.C. players
Darlington F.C. players
English Football League players
National League (English football) players
Northern Premier League players